Nikola Mardešić (born 14 June 1945) is a Croatian rower. He competed in the men's coxless pair event at the 1972 Summer Olympics.

References

1945 births
Living people
Croatian male rowers
Olympic rowers of Yugoslavia
Rowers at the 1972 Summer Olympics
Rowers from Split, Croatia